Nashville is the capital of the U.S. state of Tennessee.

Nashville may also refer to:

Places

United States
 Nashville, Arkansas
 Nashville, California
 Nashville, Georgia
 Nashville, Illinois
 Nashville, Indiana
 Nashville, Hancock County, Indiana
 Nashville, Iowa
 Nashville, Kansas
 Nashville, Michigan
 Nashville, Missouri
 Nashville, Nebraska
 Nashville, a hamlet in Hanover, Chautauqua County, New York
 Nashville, a hamlet in Wheatfield, Niagara County, New York
 Nashville, North Carolina
 Nashville, Ohio
 Nashville, Oregon
 Nashville, Texas, also known as Nashville-on-the-Brazos
 Nashville, Wisconsin, a town
 Nashville (community), Wisconsin, an unincorporated community
 Nashville Center, Minnesota
 Nashville Historic District (Nashua, New Hampshire)
 Nashville Plantation, Maine
 Nashville Township, Martin County, Minnesota

Elsewhere
 Nashville, Ontario, Canada

Music
 Nashville (Bill Frisell album), 1997
 Nashville (Andy Williams album), 1991
 Nashville (Josh Rouse album), 2005
 "Nashville", a song recorded by Stonewall Jackson and others
 Nashville!, a commercial music channel on XM Satellite Radio controlled by Clear Channel Communications
 An E9 tuning sometimes used for ten string pedal steel guitar
 Nashville sound, a subgenre of country music
 Nashville Symphony, an orchestra
 Nashville tuning (high strung), a tuning for a six string guitar

Movies and television
 Nashville (film), a 1975 American musical film directed by Robert Altman
 Nashville (2007 TV series), a Fox reality series
 Nashville (2012 TV series), an ABC and CMT drama series
 "Nashville" (Master of None), a 2015 TV episode

Other uses 
 Nashville High School (Arkansas)
 Nashville International Airport, Tennessee
 Nashville Predators, an ice hockey team based in Nashville
 Nashville SC, a MLS club based in Nashville
 CSS Nashville, two Confederate States Navy ships
 USS Nashville, three United States Navy ships
 Virginia Slims of Nashville, a defunct tennis tournament
 Windows Nashville, Microsoft codename for the canceled Windows 96 operating system

See also